is a Japanese actor.

Ishizaka graduated from Keio University with a B.L. degree. He serves as a special advisor for the Japan Plamodel Industry Association, and on 23 February 2009, he founded Rowguanes, a plastic model enthusiast group for the baby boomers.

He starred as Kosuke Kindaichi in the 1970s series of Kindaichi films.

Filmography

Film
Kindaichi series
The Inugamis (1976) – Kosuke Kindaichi
Akuma no temari-uta (1977) – Kosuke Kindaichi
Gokumon-to (1977) – Kosuke Kindaichi
Rhyme of Vengeance (1978) – Kosuke Kindaichi
Byoinzaka no Kubikukuri no Ie (1979) – Kosuke Kindaichi
The Inugamis (2006) – Kosuke Kindaichi
The Makioka Sisters (1983) – Teinosuke
Ohan (1984) – Ohan's husband
The Return of Godzilla (1984) – A reactor operator
The Burmese Harp (1985) – Inoue
Bakumatsu Seishun Graffiti: Ronin Sakamoto Ryōma (1986) – Katsu Kaishū
Princess from the Moon (1987) – Mikado
Ultra Q The Movie: Legend of the Stars (1990) – Narrator
47 Ronin (1994) – Yanagisawa Yoshiyasu
Ultraman Cosmos: The First Contact (2001) – Narrator
Ultraman Cosmos 2: The Blue Planet (2002) – Narrator
Japan Sinks (2006) – Prime Minister Yamamoto
Pokémon: The Rise of Darkrai (2007) – Darkrai (voice)
Superior Ultraman 8 Brothers (2008) – Narrator
Suspect X (2008) – A pundit
Shizumanu Taiyō (2009) – Masayuki Kunimi
Ultraman Zero: The Revenge of Belial (2010) – Narrator
Library Wars (2013) – Gen Nishina
 Library Wars: The Last Mission (2015) – Gen Nishina
Tannisho (2019) – Shinran (voice)
Mio's Cookbook (2020)
Zokki (2021)

Television
Taiga drama series
Hana no Shōgai (1963)
Akō Rōshi (1964)
Taikōki  (1965) – Ishida Mitsunari
Ten to Chi to (1969) – Nagao Kagetora
Genroku Taiheiki (1975) – Yanagisawa Yoshiyasu
Kusa Moeru (1979) – Minamoto no Yoritomo
Tokugawa Ieyasu (1983) – Naya Shōan
Hachidai Shōgun Yoshimune (1995) – Manabe Akifusa
Genroku Ryōran (1999) – Kira Kōzuke no suke
Shinsengumi! (2004) – Sakuma Shōzan
Gō (2011) – Sen no Rikyū
Ultra Q (1966) – Narrator
Kurayami Shitomenin (1974) – Itoi Mitsugu
Sekigahara (1981) – Narrator
Bakumatsu Seishun Graffiti: Sakamoto Ryōma (1982) – Katsu Kaishū
Miyamoto Musashi (1984–85) – Hon'ami Kōetsu
Bakumatsu Seishun Graffiti: Fukuzawa Yukichi (1985) – Katsu Kaishū
Onna tachi no Hyakuman goku (1988) – Maeda Toshinaga
Wataru Seken wa Oni Bakari (1990–2015) – Narrator
Mito Komon (2001–2002) – Tokugawa Mitsukuni
Shiroi Kyotō (2003) – Professor Azuma
Furuhata Ninzaburō: Final (2006) – Kyōsuke Tenma
Saka no Ue no Kumo (2009–2011) – Yamamoto Gonbei
Wagaya no Rekishi (2010) – Kafū Nagai
AIBOU: Tokyo Detective Duo (2012–present) - Mineaki Kai
Yasuragi no Sato (2017) – Sakae Kikumura
Rakuen (2017) – Kazuo Kanekawa
Yasuragi no Toki: Michi (2019–20) – Sakae Kikumura
The Grand Family (2021) – Finance minister Nagata

References

External links
 Official profile 
 Rowguanes website 
 
 Kōji Ishizaka on NHK Archives

Japanese male film actors
Japanese male television actors
1941 births
Living people
Male actors from Tokyo
Keio University alumni
Taiga drama lead actors
20th-century Japanese male actors
21st-century Japanese male actors